The 2006 Indonesia Open in badminton was held in Surabaya, from May 31 to June 4, 2006. It was a six-star tournament and the prize money was US$250,000.

Final results

Results

Men's singles

External links
Djarum Indonesian Open 2006

Indonesia Open (badminton)
Indonesia
Sports competitions in Jakarta
2006 in Indonesian sport